Sreedharan Champad is circus artist, circus historian and Malayalam language writer from Kerala, India. He has worked in a number of fields, including working as circus manager, flying trapeze artist, circus company PRO, auto driver, bill collector, journalist and writer. Champad has written over 20 books including novels, more than 100 short stories, biographies and articles. His book An Album of Indian Big Tops chronicles the history of circus industry in India from 1880 to 2010.

Biography
Sreedharan was born in 1938 at Champad near Thalassery, Kannur district to Kunjikannan and Narayani. After passing tenth class, he joined Devagiri College, Kozhikode, but due to financial constraints he dropped his study and gone to Madras. In 1956, he joined the Great Rayman circus in Howrah as office clerk and later became a trapeze artiste at the circus. Sreedharan was also an expert trapeze player in circuses such as Jumbo, Gemini, Amar and Great Raymond. In 1961, while at Chengalpet, he temporarily left circus field, when the Great Eastern Circus rejected him to go with its Malaysian tour. After studying automobile engineering in Madras for two years, he worked as a diesel mechanic in the Madras State Transport Corporation for six months. After that he worked as an auto driver in Kozhikode for some time. Sridharan was also served as the Editor-in-Chief of Padayani Weekly publishe from Thalassery, Padayani News Editor and Jagannath Magazine Editor. He has also worked as a correspondent for Kaumudi News Service for 5 years.

"Ring Boy" published in Mathrubhumi Weekly in 1964 was his first story. His first novel Anyonyamthedi nadannavarwas published in Mathrubhumu weekly in 1977. Champad is currently working on a new novel on the socio - cultural context of Panoor and its environs since 1947.

He resides at his house Srivastsa at Pathayakunnu, Pattiam in Kannur district.

Family
He and his wife Valsala have four children.

Contributions

Literary contributions
. This book chronicles the history of circus industry in India from 1880 to 2010.
Thamp paranja jeevitham (autobiography)
Sarkkasinte lokam (Meaning: world of circus)
Keeleri, Biography of Keeleri Kunjikannan
C. V. Narayanan Nair
Raktham Chinthiyavar
Anyonyam Thedi Nadannavar
Komali
Ring
Koodaram
Antharam
Arangettam Circus Kathakal
Clint
Thacholi Othenan
Payyampally Chanthu
Aromal Chekavar
Unniyarcha
Thamp
Mela, this was later made into a Malayalam movie
Athippara
Utharaparvvam
Mahacharithamala123
Gurudevakathamrutham

Cinema
He has been instrumental in the background of films like Thampu, Mela, Aaravam, Kummatty, Apoorva Sahodarangal, Joker and Bhumimalayalam. He is also the author of the Malayalam documentaries named Circus and Cirus Lokam (Circus World) broadcast by Doordarshan.

Awards and honors
Kerala Sahitya Akademi Award for Overall Contributions 2014 for his outstanding contribution to Malayalam literature.
First Vagbhadananda Prathibha Puraskaram

References

Malayalam-language writers
Indian male short story writers
Indian circus performers
People from Thalassery
1938 births

Living people